Drumming out is the historical act of being dishonorably dismissed from military service to the sound of the Rogue's March or a drum. In modern figurative usage, it may refer to any act of expulsion or dismissal in disgrace.

Origin
One of the earliest recorded references to drumming out occurs in Alexander Pope's Moral Essays, 3rd epistle, 1731–1733: "Chartres was a man infamous for all manner of vices. When he was an ensign in the army, he was drummed out of the regiment for a cheat; he was next banished Brussels, and drummed out of Ghent, on the same account."

It also occurs in a figurative sense in Thomas Amory's  1766 Life of John Buncle: "They ought to be drummed out of society."

American Revolutionary War
The earliest known discharge of an American soldier involved the drumming out of Lieutenant Frederick Gotthold Enslin for attempted sodomy in March 1778 during the Revolutionary War. The diary of Lieutenant James McMichael contains a record of the sentence being carried out:

The sentencing order, approved by George Washington, called for Enslin to be permanently drummed out of the Continental Army.

American Civil War

American Civil War officers drummed out of service might have their heads shaved and their uniforms stripped of insignia and be paraded in front of their comrades.  Fellow officers were forbidden to touch the person being dishonorably discharged, but in more than one case after the war had ended, a drummed-out man was found dead after receiving a beating from his former comrades.  When someone was being drummed out, the tune "Rogue's March" would be played.

References

See also
Cashiering

Military life
Punishments